Thomas Wade (Methodist) was a native of Fairfeild, Aughrim, and is notable as the person who invited John Wesley to preach at Eyrecourt in May 1749. Wesley spoke of the large handsome room in the Market House in which he preached.

External links
 http://places.galwaylibrary.ie/history/chapter4.html
 http://www.landedestates.ie/LandedEstates/jsp/family-show.jsp?id=1160

References
 Methodisim in Galway, Dudley Levistone Cooney, Galway, 1978

People from County Galway